The 2006 UCI Track Cycling World Championships - Men's 1 km Time Trial was the 2006 world championship track cycling time trial. It was held on April 14, 2006 at 20:20 in Bordeaux, France. The event was conducted over a single round.

World record

Results

References

Men's 1 km time trial
UCI Track Cycling World Championships – Men's 1 km time trial